Afternoon (styled as (a)fternoon) is the fourth EP by American alternative/indie band Mae. It was released independently on September 24, 2009, in conjunction with Mae Presents: Afternoon Tour.  As with their previous releases, it contains songs that will be played in concert in stereoscopic 3D. As of August, Mae updated their website and said, "joining us [on tour] will be our new friends in Locksley September 24-October 21, Jenny Owen Youngs October 22-November 8, and Deas Vail. The Afternoon Tour will feature all new 3D projection, the official release of the limited edition 'rub and smell' afternoon EP"

Track listing
All tracks by Mae

 "Good (a)fternoon" – 3:27
 "Over & Over" – 5:40
 "The Fight Song (Crash and Burn)" – 7:06
 "In Pieces" – 5:31
 "The Cure" – 4:08
 "Falling Into You" – 4:44
 "Communication" – 7:24
 "(a)fternoon in Eden" – 2:43

Personnel 
David Elkins: (born Dave Gimenez Vox, Electric & Acoustic Guitar, Ebow, Organ, Keys, Piano, Toy Piano, Fender Rhodes, Percussion, Drums & Programming, Strings
Zach Gehring: Electric & Acoustic Guitar, Ebow, Percussion
Jacob Marshall: Drums
Mark Padgett: Bass, Programming
Tom Lorsch: Strings
Dennis Wage: B3 Harmond Organ/Piano
Choir: Mark Kalagay, Andrew D. Vaught, Sean Postanowicz, Eric Godsey, Maiya Cabrero, Matthew Robinson, Vincent Jones, TuanAnh Vu, Cara Vu, Vicki Imperial, Paul Atienza, Micah Marshall, Kenny Marshall

References

External links
Mae's Official Website

2010 EPs
Mae albums